Philippe Bouchet, born 19 March 1956 at Cholet (Maine-et-Loire, France), better known as Manchu, is a science-fiction illustrator.

Bibliography 
 Art of Manchu 1 - Science (fiction), Delcourt, 2002, 96 p. (art book bilingual English-French)
 Manchu Sketchbook (Comix Buro, 2008)
 Art of Manchu 2 - Starship(s), Delcourt, 2010, 96 p. (art book bilingual English-French)
 Art of Manchu 3 - Space-O-Matic, Delcourt, 2017, 93 p. (art book bilingual English-French)

Prizes 
 Prix Bob-Morane 2001
 Grand Prix de l'Imaginaire 2001
 Prix Extraordinaire aux Utopiales 2015
 Prix du meilleur artiste européen 2015

References

External links
 Manchu : official site

French speculative fiction artists
Science fiction artists
Space artists
1956 births
Living people